Karl Friedrich Wilhelm Reyher (from 1828 von Reyher) (21 June 1786, in Groß Schönebeck – 7 October 1857, in Berlin) was a Prussian officer who served as Prussian Minister of War in the government of Gottfried Ludolf Camphausen during the Revolution of 1848. After 1848 he also served as Prussian chief of staff.

1786 births
1857 deaths
Generals of Cavalry (Prussia)
Prussian Army personnel of the Napoleonic Wars